Hyptis diversifolia is a species of flowering plant in the family Lamiaceae. Its natural habitat is subtropical or tropical moist montane forests only in Ecuador.

References

diversifolia
Endemic flora of Ecuador
Critically endangered flora of South America
Taxonomy articles created by Polbot